Lavernock Battery was built at Lavernock Point, Wales on the recommendations of the 1860 Royal Commission during the late 1860s to protect the ports of the Severn Estuary. It was replaced by a new anti-aircraft battery during World War II that was equipped with four heavy anti-aircraft guns.

History
The Palmerston government initiated a large system of coastal fortifications and Lavernock Battery was the most northerly of a chain of defences across the Bristol Channel, protecting the access to Bristol and Cardiff. Completed in 1870, the battery was initially armed with three rifled muzzle-loading (RML)  Mk III guns on disappearing carriages. An 1895 inventory reported a fourth seven-inch gun. By 1903 all four guns had been replaced by two breech-loading six-inch (152 mm) Mk VII guns.

The two 6-inch guns formed part of the Fixed Defences, Severn Scheme and protected the Atlantic shipping convoy de-grouping zone between Cardiff, Barry and Flat Holm. They were manned by men of the 531st (Glamorgan) Coast Regiment, Royal Artillery.

On 13 May 1897, Guglielmo Marconi sent the world's first ever wireless communication over open sea. The message read "Are you ready".

Description
The battery was triangular shaped with four gun emplacements, a protective ditch, barracks, a laboratory, and a magazine. Most of the battery has been demolished and the ditch filled in; a swimming pool has been built over one of the magazines. What remains is included in a holiday caravan and chalet park.

A larger magazine was positioned between two of the gun pits. All of the guns were controlled by a central director-rangefinder observation position. This battery is in good condition and has been listed as a Scheduled Ancient Monument.

References

Further reading

External links

Palmerston Forts Society

Forts in the Vale of Glamorgan
Palmerston Forts
Artillery batteries